Martanda Sydney Tondaiman (22 July 1916 – 20 January 1984) was the son and only child of Martanda Bhairava Tondaiman, Raja of Pudukkottai and his Australian wife Molly Fink.

Early life 

Martanda Sydney Tondaiman was born while his parents were residing in Sydney, Australia. Martanda Bhairava Tondaiman had left India as the British Resident of the State of Pudukkottai felt that the marriage would undermine his position among his subjects.  Both the Rajah and Ranee were received in private audience by George V and Queen Mary at Buckingham Palace in 1920 and subsequently attended by Royal command all Court functions until the Rajah's death.  The Rajah had been an extremely close friend of King George V's father, Edward VII, and attended his coronation in 1902.  Sydney was not baptised as he had been born to a non-Christian father.

Education 

Sydney was educated at the Institut Le Rosey, Switzerland and the Clare College, Cambridge from where he graduated in history. At Le Rosey, his closest friend was Mohammad Reza Pahlavi, who later sent Sydney a special invitation for his coronation in 1967. In 1938, while travelling between Cannes and Paris, Sydney met with a road accident and was left with a limp, which allowed him to use a Faberge cane that enhanced his already elegant appearance. Sydney moved to the United States and became a U.S. citizen on September 1, 1943.

Arrest 

In 1945, Sydney was arrested in New York for theft. The New York Times reported on February 18, 1945 that the prince had stated that his own "considerable funds were unavailable" to him, and that he had "only a couple of thousand dollars in the bank, not nearly enough to maintain my usual style of living". Despite the request of his accuser that he be freed on probation, Sydney was convicted and imprisoned at City Prison. It was reported in the New York Times on April 2, 1946 that after aiding in the recovery of some of the property, spending nine months of a one-year term in prison and after his mother had made full restitution, that he was released from prison.  In 1946, he was invited by Ramon Grau, President of Cuba, to reside in Havana and went there upon his release.  As a result of his conviction, his U.S. citizenship was revoked. However, in 1980, by Act of Congress, his U.S. citizenship was reinstated, and he died a United States citizen.

Later years 
In 1948, he returned to Europe and lived between London, Cannes and St. Moritz.  His company was eagerly sought after by the highest echelons of international society. In 1967 his mother died and left him a considerably wealthy man.  Sydney himself died sixteen years later, on January 20, 1984, at the Hotel de la Ville, Florence, of heart failure. His body was cremated at the Golders Green Crematorium and his ashes were interred beside those of his parents.

References 

 
 
 Papers of Pudukkottai archives, collection of Clive Kandel, legatee of the Will and Testament of Prince Martanda of Pudukkottai.

1916 births
1984 deaths
People from Sydney
Indian royalty
Alumni of Clare College, Cambridge
People convicted of theft
Golders Green Crematorium
Australian emigrants to the United Kingdom
Alumni of Institut Le Rosey